Riley Black (pen name, Brian Switek) is an American paleontologist and science writer. She is the author of natural history books such as The Last Days of the Dinosaurs, Skeleton Keys and My Beloved Brontosaurus.

Biography 
Black studied Ecology & Evolutionary Biology at Rutgers University.

Her books include The Last Days of the Dinosaurs, Skeleton Keys and My Beloved Brontosaurus. Black also previously wrote under the name Brian Switek. Black was hired as "resident paleontologist" for the 2015 film Jurassic World.

References 

Year of birth missing (living people)
Living people
American paleontologists
Women paleontologists
Rutgers University alumni